Gurdon is a city in Clark County, Arkansas, United States. The population was 2,212 at the 2010 census.


History
The town was founded in the late nineteenth century as a railroad town for the timber industry on the St. Louis, Iron Mountain and Southern Railway (now the Union Pacific Railroad).  Originally settled in 1873, the city was incorporated in 1880. The town's name derives from railroad executive Henry Gurdon Marquand's middle name.

Gurdon is the birthplace of the Concatenated Order of Hoo-Hoo, in 1892.

Geography
Gurdon is located in southern Clark County at  (33.9152871, -93.155354). U.S. Route 67 passes through the city, leading northeast  to Arkadelphia, the county seat, and southwest  to Prescott.

Demographics

2020 census

As of the 2020 United States census, there were 1,840 people, 1,016 households, and 695 families residing in the city.

2010 census
As of the 2010 United States Census, there were 2,212 people living in the city. The racial makeup of the city was 50.1% White, 37.9% Black, 0.1% Native American, 0.1% Asian, <0.1% Pacific Islander, 10.4% from some other race and 1.4% from two or more races. 14.3% were Hispanic or Latino of any race.

2000 census
At the 2000 census, there were 2,276 people, 934 households and 625 families living in the city. The racial makeup of the city was 60.24% White, 35.76% Black or African American, 0.13% Native American, 0.04% Asian, 0.04% Pacific Islander, 3.12% from other races, and 0.66% from two or more races. 4.35% of the population were Hispanic or Latino of any race.

There were 934 households, of which 32.8% had children under the age of 18 living with them, 44.9% were married couples living together, 18.7% had a female householder with no husband present, and 33.0% were non-families. 30.2% of all households were made up of individuals, and 13.9% had someone living alone who was 65 years of age or older.  The average household size was 2.44 and the average family size was 3.01.

27.9% of the population were under the age of 18, 9.7% from 18 to 24, 26.6% from 25 to 44, 20.2% from 45 to 64, and 15.6% who were 65 years of age or older. The median age was 35 years. For every 100 females, there were 85.9 males. For every 100 females age 18 and over, there were 82.0 males.

The median household income was $26,446, and the median family income was $33,564. Males had a median income of $25,479 versus $18,158 for females. The per capita income for the city was $15,043  About 14.1% of families and 19.0% of the population were below the poverty line, including 27.1% of those under age 18 and 16.8% of those age 65 or over.

Education

Public education
Elementary and secondary education is provided by the Gurdon School District, which leads students to graduate from Gurdon High School. The school's mascot is the Go-Devil with purple and gold as the school colors.

Public libraries
Gurdon is supported by the Cabe Public Library, which is a branch library of the Clark County Library System.

Gurdon Light
The town is known for the "Gurdon Light", a series of unexplained phenomena which occur in a wooded area by railroad tracks. Viewers have reported a light or lights hovering in mid-air. Local folk legend explains the light appearances as a deceased railwayman's lantern. Scientific work on the origin of the lights has proven inconclusive. The light has been featured on local media and on the TV show Unsolved Mysteries.

Notable people

 Jimmy Witherspoon, a blues artist, was born in 1923 in Gurdon and grew up there. His performances were recorded on more than 200 albums, and he established himself as a jazz-influenced bluesman.
 Daniel Davis, actor, grew up in Gurdon. He is best known for playing the role of Niles the butler in the CBS sitcom The Nanny. Davis' natural accent is Southern American. Speaking with an English accent in his role as Niles, he was believed to be English by many viewers.
 Tav Falco, a musical performer, performance artist, actor, filmmaker and photographer, was raised in Gurdon.

See also

 List of cities in Arkansas

References

External links

 "Gurdon, Clark County", Encyclopedia of Arkansas History & Culture
 Nash-Arnott shootout
  Gurdon Chamber of Commerce
 The Gurdon Times 

Cities in Arkansas
Cities in Clark County, Arkansas